Euphaniini is a tribe of spiny-legged rove beetles in the family Staphylinidae. There are at least 8 genera in Euphaniini.

Genera
These genera belong to the tribe Euphaniini:
 Deleaster Erichson, 1839
 Euphanias Fairmaire & Laboulbène, 1856
 Mitosynum Campbell, 1982;
 Oxypius Newton, 1982
 Platydeleaster Schülke, 2003
 Syntomium Curtis, 1828
† Protodeleaster Cai et al. 2013 (rove beetle)
† Pseudanotylus Cai & Huang 2013 (rove beetle)

References

Further reading

 
 
 

Oxytelinae